The British High Commissioner to South Africa is the head of the United Kingdom's diplomatic mission in the Republic of South Africa.

As fellow members of the Commonwealth of Nations, the United Kingdom and South Africa exchange high commissioners rather than ambassadors, and the high commissioner's office in Pretoria is the high commission rather than the embassy. However, from 1961 to 1994 South Africa was not a member of the Commonwealth, so for that time the British head of mission was an ambassador and his office was the embassy.

Besides the high commission in Pretoria, the UK maintains a consulate-general in Cape Town. The High Commissioner to South Africa is also accredited to the Kingdom of Eswatini (formerly Swaziland), but a resident High Commissioner to Eswatini has been appointed and is expected in post in summer 2019. From 2005 to 2019 the High Commissioner to South Africa was also accredited to the Kingdom of Lesotho.

The Republic of South Africa is the historical successor to the Union of South Africa, which came into being on 31 May 1910 with the unification of four previously separate British colonies: Cape Colony, Natal Colony, Transvaal Colony and Orange River Colony. It included the territories formerly part of the Boer republics annexed in 1902, South African Republic and Orange Free State. The Union of South Africa was a dominion of the British Empire which became sovereign (along with other dominions) in 1931. The Union became the Republic of South Africa in 1961; the country left the Commonwealth of Nations at that time but rejoined in 1994.

High Commissioners to the Union of South Africa
From 1910 to 1931 the Governor-General also held the office of High Commissioner: see Governor-General of the Union of South Africa.
1931–1935: Sir Herbert Stanley
1935–1939: Sir William Clark
1940–1941: Sir Edward Harding
1941–1944: William Ormsby-Gore, 4th Baron Harlech
1944–1951: Evelyn Baring
1951–1956: John Le Rougetel
1955–1959: Percivale Liesching
1959–1961: Sir John Maud

Ambassadors to the Republic of South Africa
1961–1963: Sir John Maud (later Lord Redcliffe-Maud)
1963–1966: Sir Hugh Stephenson
1966–1969: Sir John Nicholls
1970–1973: Sir Arthur Snelling
1973–1976: Sir James Bottomley
1976–1979: Sir David Scott
1979–1982: Sir John Leahy
1982–1984: Sir Ewen Fergusson
1984–1987: Sir Patrick Moberly
1987–1991: Sir Robin Renwick
1991–1994: Sir Anthony Reeve

High Commissioners to the Republic of South Africa

1994–1996: Sir Anthony Reeve
1996–2000: Dame Maeve Fort
2000–2005: Dame Ann Grant
2005–2009: Paul Boateng
2009–2013: Dame Nicola Brewer
2013–2017: Dame Judith Macgregor
2017–2021: Nigel Casey

2021–: Antony Phillipson

See also
 High Commissioner for Southern Africa

References

External links
UK and South Africa, gov.uk

South Africa
 
United Kingdom
South Africa and the Commonwealth of Nations